Psara bractealis is a moth of the family Crambidae described by George Hamilton Kenrick in 1907. It is found in Papua New Guinea.

It has a wingspan of 30 mm.

References

Spilomelinae
Moths described in 1907